Hungry Man Productions is an international commercial marketing and production company. The organization has been voted by Creativity Online to be  one of the top five commercial production companies in the world. It is also the only production company to be ranked within the top ten at the Cannes Advertising Festival's Palme d'Or for over ten consecutive years. The organization has created well over 50 Super Bowl commercials over a ten-year period.

History
Hungry Man Productions was started in 1997, by Hank Perlman and Bryan Buckley. The pair first collaborated on ESPN's "This is SportsCenter" campaign, which was named as one of the Top 10 Commercial Campaigns of the 20th century by TV Guide. The campaign was originally created by Perlman and directed by Buckley (along with Frank Todaro). , the organization is headquartered in New York City and has additional offices in Los Angeles, São Paulo, Rio de Janeiro, and London.

References

External links 
 
 http://creativity-online.com/news/production-company-alist-2011-hungry-man/232832
 http://theinspirationroom.com/daily/tag/hungry-man/
 https://www.variety.com/article/VR1117965634?refCatId=1009

Marketing organizations
American companies established in 1997
Companies based in New York City